Sítio do Lugar de Baixo (Portuguese for bottom place) is a sea village in the municipality of Ponta do Sol in the Portuguese archipelago of Madeira. The population in 2011 was 336, in an area of 0.47 km².

History
This coastal platform was formed in the year 1803 by a massive cliff slide into the ocean.
The origin of the toponymy Lugar de Baixo is linked to this event when a part of the Lombada locality slid down forming the low sea platform.

Geography
This village on the south-west coast of Madeira is a natural amphitheater fronting the Atlantic Ocean to the south and steep rock cliffs to the north. Man-made stone walls terraces of volcanic soil shape the landscape.
The waves break large and surfing is enjoyed here by experienced surfers.

Economy

The main activities in the community are the cultivation of bananas, flowers, and tourism. Much of the land along the cliff faces is occupied by terraced fields with rows of banana trees.
This sun-drenched and fertile coastal platform produces bananas, mango, and papayas that are reputed to be the best on the island.

Climate
Its climate is believed to be the warmest of any other place in Madeira with a climatic station. In recent years (such as 2016 or 2020), none of the average monthly temperatures got down below , putting its climate close to tropical savanna.

Places of interest

Lagoa do Lugar de Baixo
A tidal lagoon where many species of migratory birds use it as a breeding ground or stopping point. The visitor center next to the lagoon is currently closed to the public. In 2003, the Madeiran government began a program of coastal engineering. This is when the current sea rock berm protecting the lagoon was built consisting of large rocks fixed to the shoreline. This has a negative impact on the surf tube wave which used to stay open for 100 meters or more.

Palacete dos Zinos
Also known as Palacete do Lugar de Baixo. Currently operating as a boutique 9 rooms hotel under the name of 1905 Zino's Palace. It was renovated in 2019 and opened to the public at the beginning of 2020. It is one of the few romantic buildings in Madeira, exemplifying the archipelago's rich architectural heritage. It was built in the late 19th century as a summer home for the Zino family, taking advantage of the excellent climate of the area.

References

Populated places in Madeira